Lamogai is an Austronesian language spoken by about 3600 individuals in parts of West New Britain Province, Papua New Guinea on the island of New Britain.

References

Languages of West New Britain Province
Ngero–Vitiaz languages